The 2020 Derry Senior Football Championship was the 97th edition of Derry GAA's premier gaelic football tournament for the top clubs. The sixteen teams who qualified for the 2020 senior championship are explained in the 'Competition Format' section below.

Due to the COVID-19 pandemic, all Gaelic Game activity was suspended in March. As a result the 2020 Derry senior championship was changed to an initial group structure where each team played three games before playing at least one game in the final knockout stage.

Slaughtneil beat the defending champions Magherafelt 0-11 to 1-04 at Bellaghy to win their 6th title.

The winners received the John McLaughlin Cup.

Competition format

Senior, Intermediate and Junior Championships

Team performances in 2019 in the football league and championships were used to determine which of the three 2020 championships the thirty seven clubs competed in – 
 2020 Senior Championship (16 teams)All twelve 2019 Division 1A teams plus four 2019 Division 1B teams.The winners of the 2019 intermediate championship must be included.
 2020 Intermediate Championship (12 teams)Eight 2019 Division 1B teams plus four 2019 Division 2 teams.The winners of the 2019 junior championship must be included.
 2020 Junior Championship (9 teams)Nine 2019 Division 2 teams.Ógra Colmcille opted out in 2019.

Senior Championship Teams in 2019

The restructured adult football leagues in Derry of Division 1A (12 teams), Division 1B (12 teams) and Division 2 (13 teams) were introduced in 2019. Five teams were relegated from the 2018 Division 1 to the new 2019 Division 1B (see section 'Relegations and promotions in 2018' below for details). The 2019 senior championship was competed for by the top fifteen teams in the 2018 Division 1 and Banagher, the winners of the 2018 Division 2. Claudy, who finished 16th in 2018, were relegated to the 2019 intermediate football championship.

2020 Format

Initially the sixteen teams were drawn into four groups of four teams. Each team were guaranteed three group games and at least one knockout game. All sixteen teams qualified for the knock-out stages. In the first round draw the teams were seeded from the group stage with the group winners playing the teams who finished fourth and the group runner-ups playing the teams who finished third. The quarter final draw was open but subject to the restriction that repeat pairings be avoided if possible. The semi final draw was open.

Recent history of relegations and promotions

Relegations and promotions in 2019

Senior Championship

All twelve teams in the 2019 Division 1A automatically qualified for the 2020 senior championship. Four 2019 Division 1B teams also qualified for the 2020 senior football championship –
 Claudy finished 1st in 2019 Division 1B with 19 points.
 Newbridge finished 2nd in 2019 Division 1B with 17 points.
 Kilrea finished 3rd in 2019 Division 1B with 14 points.
 Foreglen won the intermediate championship, defeating Claudy by 0-15 to 0-09. Foreglen took the place in the 2020 senior championship reserved for the 2019 intermediate champions (instead of Greenlough who finished 4th in 2019 Division 1B with 14 points).

League

Two teams were relegated from Division 1A and were replaced by two teams from Division 1B –
 Dungiven finished 11th in 2019 Division 1A with 3 points. They were relegated but retained the right to play in the 2020 senior football championship.
 Banagher finished 12th in 2019 Division 1A with 0 points. They were relegated but retained the right to play in the 2020 senior football championship.
 Claudy finished 1st in 2019 Division 1B with 19 points and were promoted.
 Newbridge finished 2nd in 2019 Division 1B with 17 points and were promoted.

Senior Championship Group Stage

The draw for the group stage was held on Thursday 25 June 2020.

Group A

Group B

Group C

Group D

Senior Championship Full Draw

First Knockout Round
First Knockout Round draw took place on Monday 24 August. Group ranking was used to decide the draw – 1v4 and 2v3.

Additions and corrections required for scorers.

Quarter-finals
Quarter-final Draw took place after the Magherafelt v Lavey match.

Semi-finals
The draw was made after the Slaughtneil v Glen quarter-final

Final

Top Scorer
Semi-final Completed.

References

Derry SFC
Derry Senior Football Championship
Derry Senior Football Championship
Derry Senior Football Championship
Derry Senior Football Championship